Eupithecia placens is a moth in the family Geometridae. It is found in New Guinea.

The forewings are whitish green overlaid with grey. The hindwings are whitish grey with traces of lines and a paler submarginal band.

References

Moths described in 1906
placens
Moths of Asia